The American television game show The Price Is Right has, since its 1972 relaunch, employed a number of models  to showcase the prizes and items that are given away on the show. From 1972 to 2007, the group was referred to as "Barker's Beauties", in reference to Bob Barker, who hosted the show during that period.

History

1956–65 
The original Price Is Right also employed models. Usually, two models appeared per episode to model the prizes, much in the same tradition as the later incarnations. As is the case with the Carey era of the current version, the models were not referred to specifically by a nickname.

June Ferguson and Toni Wallace were the regular models, staying with the program for its entire nine year run. Various other models either assisted Ferguson and Wallace, or appeared during their absences.

1972–present 
Over 25 women have appeared as models on The Price Is Right since the program's premiere. For the first three years, there were two models – Janice Pennington and Anitra Ford. Dian Parkinson joined Pennington and Ford permanently in 1975 after previously appearing only periodically.

Ford left the program in 1976 and was later replaced by Holly Hallstrom who joined the cast in 1977. Pennington, Parkinson and Hallstrom appeared as the three main models on both the daytime and syndicated versions of the show from 1977–1993.

In December 1990, the three were joined by the program's first permanent African American model, Kathleen Bradley. During this period, Kyle Aletter (daughter of Frank Aletter and Lee Meriwether) appeared as the substitute model whenever one of the principal models was unable to appear in a given episode.

Parkinson left the show in 1993 "to pursue other interests" as stated by Barker, although speculation among some felt her departure was due to ongoing difficulties with Pennington. The following year, Parkinson filed a litigation suit claiming that Barker had been sexually harassing her beginning in the 1980s. Parkinson withdrew the suit in 1995.

Parkinson was replaced by several other women (including Cindy Margolis) until Gena Lee Nolin was hired in 1994.  Hallstrom was dismissed from the show in 1995 by Barker on the basis of weight gain (due to prescription medication), although Hallstrom alleged that she was dismissed for her refusal to support Barker in his then-ongoing litigation with Parkinson. Barker sued Hallstrom for slander and libel and Hallstrom countersued Barker for wrongful termination and age, weight, and medical discrimination. Eventually, Hallstrom was awarded a multimillion-dollar settlement in 2005.

After Hallstrom's termination and Nolin's departure that same year, Chantel Dubay was hired as the third model in 1996. Dubay left the show in 1999 and was replaced by Nikki Ziering.

In 2000, Pennington and Bradley were dismissed from the program in (what was claimed as) an attempt to attract a younger demographic. Their dismissals came after Barker's failed lawsuit against Hallstrom. Both Pennington and Bradley filed for wrongful termination and settled out-of-court for an undisclosed amount.

Pennington and Bradley were replaced by Heather Kozar and Claudia Jordan in 2001. Ziering and Kozar both left the program in 2002. At that time, Jordan became the only "permanent" model and was joined by a rotating cast of additional models.

Jordan's departure came in 2003 after she formally complained about racial discrimination on the set. Jordan filed for wrongful termination and racial discrimination and also received an out-of-court settlement. After Jordan's dismissal, The Price Is Right no longer featured the same model or group of models on a daily basis. In addition to several models who are more-or-less a permanent part of the cast, new models appeared every few weeks who sometimes eventually joined the rotation, or other times appeared for a single set of tapings. That procedure was changed in late 2008 as contracts expired.

The show has six permanent models: Rachel Reynolds, Amber Lancaster, Manuela Arbeláez, James O'Halloran, Devin Goda and Alexis Gaube. Each episode features two or three models. Occasionally only one model is present when appearing alongside a guest personality from a program airing, produced, or distributed by CBS, or taped at CBS Television City.

The models are now referred as "The Price Is Right models" when making public appearances with Carey. As part of the change, starting in December 2009, the show's models are now listed in the show's full credit roll. Beginning with the 2010–11 season, the models wear microphones so they can be heard when they are talking with Carey or the contestant. On some episodes only two models are featured, with the announcer serving as a third model for games that feature three models.

Starting in 2012, the models assumed additional roles. Their roles expanded on the show's website, including model interviews to participating in their own "reality" web series, Male Model Search, where they served as judges (in 2012 and 2014). In a 2013 episode, they participated in an episode theme on April Fool's Day in which the models swapped roles with the host and announcer. In 2014, former Miss USA Shanna Moakler was one of the celebrity judges to select a new male model for the show. Other judges included the show's executive producer Mike Richards and the show's first male model Robert Scott Wilson.

Nighttime versions 
The daytime models appeared on the 1970s syndicated nighttime version as well, with a few notable exceptions. Additional models besides Parkinson were also featured on the nighttime show, including Janice's sister Ann Pennington and a black model known only by her first name, Harriet.

On the 1985 syndicated version, Pennington, Parkinson, and Hallstrom appeared throughout the run. However, on the 1994 syndicated version, an entirely separate cast of models was featured: Julie Lynn Cialini, Ferrari Farris, and Lisa Stahl Sullivan.

Since the premiere of the CBS prime time series in 2002 and beginning with The Price Is Right $1,000,000 Spectaculars in 2003, there are often situations where four to seven models appear on each episode.

List of models

Guest models 
In February 2006, supermodel  Tyra Banks appeared as a guest model and assisted during two games.

Since Drew Carey became host in 2007, celebrities and sports professionals have appeared during specific segments (especially Showcases themed around the subject) on many episodes to promote prizes related to their professions, including Wayne Newton, Lou Ferrigno, Reba McEntire, Jim Nantz, Heidi Newfield, the United States women's national soccer team, Chuck Finley, James Corden, Edwin Aldrin, Jr., Carl Edwards, Kit Hoover, John McCook,  Natalie Morales, Jake Paul, Katie Stam, Blake Shelton, Bomshel,  and WWE Divas Kelly Kelly and the Bella Twins.

During season 37, manufacturers of products began offering their representatives to model the equipment, such as athletes signed to play with that brand's equipment or who represent a specific sports manufacturer, musicians under contract with the instrument's manufacturer or corporate representatives of another product or service. They have mostly appeared during One Bids but also during the Showcase. Carey will introduce the individual modeling the prize and their affiliation to the manufacturer or prize provider.

In both 2009 and 2010, Kathy Kinney appeared on the April Fool's Day episodes, reprising her role as Mimi Bobeck from The Drew Carey Show. In 2009, she appeared as a model, and in 2010, she acted as the executive producer, with the show's models trading places with three male staffers.

Occasionally, there is a crossover with other shows airing on, owned or distributed by CBS featuring actors of those shows modeling prizes. These crossovers have included The Late Late Show with Craig Ferguson, The Amazing Race, Let's Make a Deal, The Bold and the Beautiful, and The Young and the Restless. Tiffany Coyne (from Let's Make a Deal) filled in as the fifth model on some episodes which aired in March 2011. Daniel Goddard (Cane Ashby from The Young and the Restless) frequently crosses over as a guest model, especially when a Showcase skit necessitates, and when needed, for "masculine" prizes (motorcycles, trucks, et al.). Goddard's use as a crossover model resulted in the show standardizing the use of a male model.

In season 40 (2010), show model Rachel Reynolds and husband David Dellucci, a former Major League Baseball player, modeled wedding formal wear.

The Mother's Day 2012 episode (May 11, 2012) featured special guests fitting with the theme. Florence Henderson and personal trainer Johannes Brugger (the show's first non-crossover or product-placement male guest model) appeared together. Also, the father and son combination of TNT NBA analyst Kenny Smith (a crossover with the CBS/Turner NCAA March Madness) and Malloy, the husband and son of show model Gwendolyn Osborne, appeared. And, as with Reynolds, they announced Gwendolyn's pregnancy.

During selected spring 2014 episodes, ballroom dancer Cheryl Burke, Carey's partner in season 18 of Dancing with the Stars, appeared on episodes and modeled prizes.

Announcer 
The announcer models prizes such as men's watches, suits, and other accessories, a practice that began with original announcer Johnny Olson and has continued with his three successors (Rod Roddy, Rich Fields, and George Gray). The announcer also appeared in Showcase skits, sometimes modeling the prizes or playing a character in a story line. Starting in 2010, on episodes where two models appear in games typically featuring three models, the announcer will assume the third model's role and often is paired with another model when describing prizes. With a video screen added to the announcer's podium in 2011 tapings, a prize (or graphics for trips) may be displayed on the announcer's podium, and some prizes (such as a laptop computer) may be modeled by the announcer from his podium.

Conflicts

With Barker 
In addition to the litigation suits, several other staff members have filed lawsuits against Barker and the program, alleging sexual harassment and wrongful termination. After Parkinson brought forth sexual harassment allegations against Barker, he called a press conference to admit a past consensual sexual relationship with her.

When asked in a USA Today interview about the four most famous Beauties (Bradley, Hallstrom, Parkinson, and Pennington), Barker replied, "They've been such a problem. I don't want to say anything about them. They're disgusting; I don't want to mention them." Barker gave praise to the rotating models featured during his last years as host of the program, calling them "the best models we've ever had".

All lawsuits, except for Hallstrom's, were settled out of court. Barker himself dropped his slander suit against Hallstrom, who countersued and received millions in settlement.

With other staff members 
Two other Barker-era models who were added in the 2000s and went through the host transition have also filed lawsuits, with lawsuits targeting Executive Producer Mike Richards and producer Adam Sandler (not to be confused with the film star) for inappropriate behavior on the set. Brandi Sherwood won her lawsuit against the show in November 2012, which pertained to the show terminating her while on maternity leave, and was awarded over $8,000,000 in damages, both punitive and personal.

References 

Models
American television-related lists

Lists of models